The UK Statistics Authority (UKSA) is a non-ministerial government department of the Government of the United Kingdom responsible for oversight of the Office for National Statistics, maintaining a national code of practice for official statistics, and accrediting statistics that comply with the Code as National Statistics. UKSA was established on 1 April 2008 by the Statistics and Registration Service Act 2007, and is directly accountable to the Parliament of the United Kingdom.

Background 
Gordon Brown, then Chancellor of the Exchequer, announced on 28 November 2005, that the government intended to publish plans in early 2006 to legislate to render the Office for National Statistics (ONS) and the statistics it generates independent of government on a model based on the independence of the Monetary Policy Committee of the Bank of England. This was originally a 1997 Labour Party manifesto commitment and was also the policy of the Liberal Democrat and Conservative parties. Such independence was also sought by the Royal Statistical Society and the Statistics Commission. The National Statistician, who is the chief executive of the ONS, would be directly accountable to Parliament through a widely constituted independent governing Statistics Board. The ONS would be a non-ministerial government department so that the staff, including the Director, would remain as civil servants but without being under direct ministerial control. The National Statistician at the time, Karen Dunnell, stated that the legislation would help improve public trust in official statistics although the ONS already acts independently according to its own published guidelines, the National Statistics Code of Practice, which sets out the key principles and standards that official statisticians, including those in other parts of the Government Statistical Service, are expected to follow and uphold.

The details of the plans for independence were considered in Parliament during the 2006/2007 session and resulted in the Statistics and Registration Service Act 2007. In July 2007, Sir Michael Scholar was nominated by the government to be the three-day-a-week non-executive chairman of the Statistics Board which, to re-establish faith in the integrity of government statistics, has statutory responsibility for oversight of UK government statistics and of the Office for National Statistics. It also has a duty to assess all UK government statistics. Following Gordon Brown's later announcement on his 2007 appointment as Prime Minister of new constitutional arrangements for public appointments, Sir Michael also became, on 18 July, the first such nominee to appear before the House of Commons Treasury Committee and to have his nomination subject to confirmation by the House. On 7 February 2008, following the first meeting of the shadow board, it was announced that the body would be known as the UK Statistics Authority.

UKSA was established on 1 April 2008 by the Statistics and Registration Service Act 2007, and is directly accountable to the Parliament of the United Kingdom. It reports to Parliament through the Minister for the Cabinet Office.

Functions 

Formally, the UK Statistics Authority has two main functions: a production arm – the Office for National Statistics – and a regulatory arm – the Office for Statistics Regulation.

Office for National Statistics 
The ONS is responsible for collecting, analysing and distributing statistical information about the UK's economy, society and population. It replaces the role previously performed by HM Treasury ministers.

Office for Statistics Regulation 
The Office for Statistics Regulation (OSR) performs independent monitoring of official statistics, including assessment of the coverage, completeness and usefulness of statistics in particular areas. The OSR is also responsible for maintaining a Code of Practice for Official Statistics, and accrediting Code-compliant statistics as 'National Statistics'. However, the chair can also act to comment on perceived misuse of official statistics by persons responsible or accountable for them. The assessment function has an operational role of producing reports on code compliance of specific sets of national statistics, and also a role making more strategic recommendations for the improvement of statistical outputs, in terms of both the presentation and coverage of official statistics as well as monitoring public trust in government statistics.

The UKSA has reported on the need to improve commentary supporting the release of official statistics, and the procedures and extent of pre-release access to official statistics by government ministers. The authority has also produced reports on the impact of cuts to specific statistical activity, such as the citizenship survey, especially where these changes affect users in other bodies. Other reports focus on statistics relating to a particular sector such as health and charities both of which have relevant data collected by more than one government body. A specific stream of work has been on user engagement, identifying the uses of official statistics and the extent to which the needs of users are taken into account by producers.

Current Board members

Ex officio executive members 
As well as the nine non-executive members of the Board, there are three civil servants who serve as executive members as a part of their jobs. They are:

 Prof. Sir Ian Diamond FBA FRSE FAcSS, the National Statistician and head of the Government Statistical Service, took up post 22 October 2019
 Ed Humpherson CB, the Authority's Head of Assessment, responsible for the independent assessment of official statistics
 Sam Beckett, second permanent secretary, takes the third executive place on the board which had previously been held on a rotational basis by the deputy national statisticians
The three Office for National Statistics (ONS) Directors General normally attend meetings of the board but are formally not members:
 Mike Keoghan, ONS Director General and Deputy National Statistician for Economic, Social & Environmental Statistics
 Alison Pritchard, ONS Director General and Deputy National Statistician for Data Capability
 Pete Benton, ONS Director General and Deputy National Statistician for Health, Population & Methods

Former Board members

References

External links 

Non-ministerial departments of the Government of the United Kingdom
Office for National Statistics
Government agencies established in 2008
2008 establishments in the United Kingdom